Vasco Gil Sodré (c. 1450 – c. 1500) was a Portuguese navigator and one of the first settlers of the island of Graciosa. Although he attempted to obtain the Donatary captaincy of the island, he and his progenitors were the origin of many of the families of the island.

Early life
Born in Montemor-o-Novo, the son of Gil Sodré and nephew of the English nobleman John de Sudley (transliterated to João de Sodré, where Sodré was corrupted from the English Sudeley or Sudley. John Sudley was a descendant of William le Boteler, which explains the commonality of his coat-of-arms in England and Portugal, between the Boteler (Butler) and Sodré families.

Marriage
Vasco Gil Sodré was married twice: first to Iria Vaz do Couto, daughter of Duarte Barreto do Couto, the first Donatary captain of Graciosa; and the second to Beatriz Gonçalves da Silva, who accompanied him to the island. He had one daughter named Isabel (Sodre).

Beatriz Gonçalves da Silva was referred to, by Gaspar Frutuoso, as Beatriz Gonçalves de Bectaforte, native of the castle of Bectaforte in England, which is a confusion arising from later descendants of Vasco Gil Sodré. From this marriage, he had Diogo Vaz Sodré, Fernão Vaz Sodré, Mécia Vaz, Leonor Vaz and Inês Vaz, as well as others, comprising ten children, that were the progenitors of the island of Graciosa.

Duarte Barreto do Couto, brother of his first wife, was married to Antónia Sodré, making them double in-laws. Although there are few record, Duarte Barreto do Couto, more commonly known as Duarte Barreto, noble of the Algarve, was Donatary captain of the southern part of the island, which was later incorporated into the territory of the captaincy of Graciosa.

Graciosa
Vasco Gil Sodré came to Graciosa following the mysterious disappearance of Duarte Barreto do Couto, who died during a Castilian incursion into Graciosa (probably in 1475, during the War of the Castilian Succession). Becoming a widow, and alone on the island, Antónia Sodré wrote to her brother, so that he could come to stay with her.

Responding to her invitation, Vasco Gil Sodré came to Graciosa, after a stopping at several north African settlements, arriving at a time in which Portugal was at war with the Crown of Castile, owing to the pretensions Joanna la Beltraneja, between 1475 and 1479.

Gil Sodré was accompanied by Beatriz Gonçalves da Silva, and a group of servants, arriving in Graciosa after staying in Terceira. The family erected a house in Carapacho, a place near to their lands in the southwest of the island, in what is today Praia.

Vasco Gil Sodré attempted to obtain the Donatary captaincy of the island, including the construction of a customs-house on his part, the captaincy of the north (centered on Santa Cruz da Graciosa) was given to Pedro Correia da Cunha (brother-in-law of Christopher Columbus, who arrived on the island from Porto Santo, after losing the captaincy, in 1474.

Despite the efforts of the Sodré family, in 1485 Pedro Correia da Cunha was confirmed as Donatary Captain for the entire island, owing to the fact that the "land was too small for two divisions", effectively impeding Vasco Gil Sodré and his descendants from obtaining the captaincy they claimed. This decision definitively unified the captaincy of Graciosa, until the Donatary system was abolished. The division resulted in the two municipalities on the island (Praia da Graciosa and Santa Cruz da Graciosa), later unified in 186]. Vasco died at Santa Cruz da Graciosa.

References
Notes

Sources
 
 
 
 
 
 
 

Sodre Vasco Gil
1450 births
1500 deaths
15th-century Portuguese people
People from Montemor-o-Velho